Alfons Hecher (born 16 October 1943) is a German former wrestler who competed in the 1972 Summer Olympics.

References

External links
 

1943 births
Living people
Olympic wrestlers of West Germany
Wrestlers at the 1972 Summer Olympics
German male sport wrestlers
Sportspeople from Upper Bavaria
People from Freising (district)